Kinder Joy (formerly known as Kinder Merendero in Italy and Bahrain)  is a candy made by Italian confectionery company Ferrero as part of its Kinder brand of products. It has plastic egg-shaped packaging that splits into two; one half contains layers of cocoa and milk cream, and the other half contains a toy and a spoon on top of the wrapper.

Overview
Kinder Joy is a brand within the Kinder line of chocolate products sold by Ferrero. It has a plastic egg-shaped package with a tab to open it into two halves.  One sealed half contains layers of cocoa and milk-flavoured creams topped with two cocoa wafer spheres, to be eaten with an included spoon. The other half contains a toy. , Kinder Joy is produced in Poland, India, South Africa, Ecuador, Cameroon, and China.
Its main ingredients include sugar, vegetable oils (palm and sunflower), milk and wheat.

History

Ferrero launched Kinder Joy in Italy in 2001. It has been sold in Spain since 2004, in Germany since May 2006 and in China and India since 2007. It was launched in Australia and the United States in 2018.

In 2011, Ferrero opened a factory in Baramati, India, to make the eggs, in addition to other products including Tic Tacs. In 2015, the company opened its first factory in China in the Xiaoshan District of Hangzhou, which produced Kinder Joy as its first manufacturing line.  Kinder Joy was one of the highest selling candy products in the Chinese market and had received Nielsen China’s Breakthrough Innovation Award.

Kinder Joy became available in Ireland in 2015. In November 2015, Ferrero announced that it would sell the eggs in the United Kingdom, starting in December 2015.

In May 2017, it was announced that Kinder Joy would be launched in the United States in 2018, as a similar product by Kinder, Kinder Surprise, is banned in the U.S. by a federal law. Specifically, the Federal Food, Drug, and Cosmetic Act bans all food products that contain non-nutritive objects embedded within them.

References

External links
 

Ferrero SpA brands
Chocolate
Candy
Food and drink introduced in 2001